Thomas Huber (born 14 July 1955, in Zurich) is a Swiss artist who lived and worked in Mettmann near Düsseldorf for several years and is currently resident in Berlin.

Biography
From 1977 to 1978 Huber studied at the Kunstgewerbeschule Basel with Franz Fedier, in 1979 at the Royal College of Art, London, and from 1980 to 1983 at the Kunstakademie Düsseldorf (as a master student of Fritz Schwegler). From 1992 to 1999 he was professor at the Hochschule für Bildende Künste Braunschweig and in 1992 interim director of the Centraal Museum, Utrecht. Together with Bogomir Ecker, he initiated and realised the "Künstlermuseum" in 2001, the reconfiguration of the Museum Kunstpalast's collection in Düsseldorf. Between 2000 and 2002 Huber was chairman of the Deutscher Künstlerbund (German Artists Association).

Work

Thomas Huber is an artist who fuses image and text and lectures on his pictures. He realises his conception of the image in various mediums: paintings, aquarelle, drawings, objects, graphic arts, art within architecture, artist lectures, and artists books. For instance, his painting Rede in der Schule ("Lecture in the School") depicts the main auditorium in the Kunstakademie Düsseldorf.

Rather than showing realities in his work, Huber, like an architect, interweaves the picture space with design structures and allows motifs such as diamonds and squares to become a determining element of the work. Accompanying philosophical and poetic texts demonstrate that the picture space is seen as "a meaning space and the picture depth as profundity".

The artist says about his work: "My pictures show spaces. You can see them but you can’t get to them; it is as if they are sealed behind clear glass. The picture is a promise that cannot be honoured, it is a wistful, sad thing."

Awards
1984: Kiefer-Hablitzer Foundation Prize
1985: Grant from Kunstfonds, Bonn
1987: Rheinbrücke (today Manor Cultural Prize), Basel
1989/1990: Award from the Kulturkreis im Bundesverband der Deutschen Industrie [Federal Association of German Industry], Berlin
1993: Prize for Young Swiss Art from the Zürcher Kunstgesellschaft (Kunstpreis der Stadt Zürich)
1993: Kunstpreis der Stadtsparkasse Düsseldorf
1995: Niedersächsischer Kunstpreis, Hannover
1999: Art Multiple Prize, Düsseldorf (today Cologne Fine Art & Antiques-Preis), Cologne
2005: Prize of the Heitland Foundation (Kunstpreis der Heitland Foundation, Celle)
2013: Prix Meret Oppenheim, Bern

Major exhibitions
Thomas Huber. Der Rote Fries, Toulouse: Festival international d’art de Toulouse, L’Espace EDF Bazacle (2014).
Thomas Huber. Vous êtes ici. Thomas Huber est au Mamco, Geneva: Mamco, musée d'art moderne et contemporain (2012).
Thomas Huber. rauten traurig / la langueur des losanges, travelling exhibition: Herford: MARTa Herford; Nîmes: carré d’art, musée d’art contemporain; Tübingen: Kunsthalle Tübingen (2008–2009).
Thomas Huber. Das Kabinett der Bilder/ Het Schilderkabinet, retrospective exhibition: Aarau: Aargauer Kunsthaus; Rotterdam: Museum Boijmans Van Beuningen; Krefeld: Kaiser Wilhelm Museum and Haus Lange (2004–2005).
Thomas Huber. Huberville. Sonnez les matines, Rochechouart: Musée départemental d’art contemporain (2003).
Thomas Huber. Glockenläuten / Laat der kokken luiden / Sonnez les martines, Brussels: Palais des Beaux-Arts; Zurich: Helmhaus Zürich; Wolfsburg: Städtische Galerie Wolfsburg (2000).
Thomas Huber. Die Bank. Eine Wertvorstellung / Der Duft des Geldes, Utrecht: Centraal Museum Utrecht; Hanover: Kestner-Gesellschaft; Frankfurt am Main: Museum für Moderne Kunst; Zurich: Kunsthaus Zürich (1991–1993).
Thomas Huber. Die Urgeschichte der Bilder / La Préhistoire des Tableaux, Basel: Museum für Gegenwartskunst; Berlin: Neuer Berliner Kunstverein; Friedrichshafen: Städtisches Bodensee-Museum, Munster: Westfälischer Kunstverein, Regensburg: Städtische Galerie im leeren Beutel; Strasbourg: Les Musées de la Ville de Strasbourg (1987–1988).
Thomas Huber. Sept Lieux, Paris: Centre Georges Pompidou, installation of all his former works as the reconstruction of their original exhibition venues (1988–1989).
Thomas Huber. Ein öffentliches Bad für Münster, in: Skulptur Projekte Münster ´87, Munster: Cathedral Square And Westfälisches Landesmuseum für Kunst und Kulturgeschichte (1987).
Thomas Huber. Der Besuch im Atelier, Düsseldorf: Exhibition Centre Fairground Hall 13 in the exhibition “von hier aus” (1984).

Work groups (selection)
The Red Frieze (2013–2014), You Are Here (2012), sad facets (2005–2007), Cabinet of Paintings (2004), Theoretical Paintings I and II (2001–2003; 2010–2011), The Peal of the Bells  (1999–2000), The Bank (1991–1993), The Library (1988), The Picture Storeroom/Opus (1988), Wedding (1985–1986), The Visit in the Studio (1984), Talk in the School (1983), Talk on Creation (1982), Talk on the Great Flood  (1982).

Artist books (selection)
Thomas Huber. Mesdames et Messieurs. Conférences 1982–2010. With a foreword by Stefan Kunz. Geneva: Mamco, 2012
Thomas Huber. rauten traurig / la langueur des losanges / sad facets. MARTa Herford (ed.); Kunsthalle Tübingen; Musée d'Art Contemporain de Nîmes, Kerber Verlag, Bielefeld, 2008, [de, fr, en], Bielefeld/Leipzig: Kerber Verlag, 2008
Thomas Huber. Das Kabinett der Bilder. Aargauer Kunsthaus Aarau, 2004; Museum Boijmans Van Beuningen, Rotterdam, 2004; Kaiser Wilhelm Museum, Krefeld, 2005. Ed. by Beat Wismer, Essays by Oskar Bätschmann and others. Baden: Verlag Lars Müller Publishers, 2004
Thomas Huber. Die Bibliothek in Aarau. Aargauer Kunsthaus Aarau (ed.), Baden: Verlag Lars Müller Publishers, 2003 (Schriften zur Aargauischen Kunstsammlung)
Thomas Huber. Glockenläuten / Sonnez les matines / The Peal of the Bells, Palais des Beaux-Arts, Brussels; Helmhaus, Zürich; Städtische Galerie Wolfsburg (ed.), 2000
Thomas Huber. Schauplatz. Kunstverein Düsseldorf; Stadthaus Ulm, 1998–1999. Ed. by Raimund Stecker. Düsseldorf: Richter Verlag, 1998
Thomas Huber. Das Studio. Stadtsparkasse Düsseldorf, 1993. Darmstadt: Häusser Verlag, 1993
Thomas Huber. Das Bild. Texte 1980–1992. Ed. by Carl Haenlein. Hannover, 1992
Thomas Huber. Der Duft des Geldes. Die Bank. Eine Wertvorstellung. Centraal Museum Utrecht (ed.); Kestner-Gestellschaft, Hanover; Kunsthaus Zürich, Conception: Thomas Huber, Ellen de Bruijne, Let Geerling. Darmstadt: Häusser Verlag, 1992
Thomas Huber. Die Urgeschichte der Bilder / La préhistoire des tableaux. Öffentliche Kunstsammlung Basel, Museum für Gegenwartskunst (ed.), 1987; Les Musées de la Ville de Strasbourg, 1988. Essays by Jörg Zutter and Thomas Huber. Basel, 1987
Thomas Huber. Rede in der Schule, Vista Point, Cologne, 1986, with 24 illustrations and slides

References

External links
Website: Thomas Huber
 
Galerie Skopia art contemporain, Genf: Thomas Huber

Swiss contemporary artists
1955 births
Living people
Artists from Zürich
Kunstakademie Düsseldorf alumni